A bikini is a type of women's bathing suit.

Bikini may also refer to:

Places
 Bikini Atoll, part of the Marshall Islands in the Pacific Ocean, for which the bathing suit was named
 Bikini Bottom, a fictional city in the TV series SpongeBob SquarePants

Music
 Bikini (Hungarian band), a Hungarian rock band
 Bikini Kill, an American punk rock band
 "Itsy Bitsy Teenie Weenie Yellow Polkadot Bikini", a 1959 novelty song

Other uses

 Bikini contest, a competition where women compete against each other, dressed in bikinis
 BIKINI state, an indication of an alert state used by the British government from 1970 to 2006
 Bikini waxing, a type of hair removal in the pubic region
 Bikinis Sports Bar & Grill, a restaurant chain based in Texas